Boulder Glacier is located on the southeast slope of Mount Baker, a stratovolcano near the Pacific coast of North America in the Cascade Range of Washington. It is noteworthy for retreating  between 1987 and 2008, leaving newly exposed rock and soil behind.

Between 1850 and 1950, the glacier retreated . William Long of the United States Forest Service observed the glacier beginning to advance due to cooler and wetter weather in 1953. This was followed by a  advance by 1979. The 1979 terminus position is where the small stream enters Boulder Creek from the southwest. Observations in 2005 suggest that the lowest thousand feet or several hundred meters of the glacier is stagnant and will likely disappear. In the pictures, this section of the glacier is gray with rock debris and has few crevasses.  On the west side of Boulder Creek is a small waterfall revealed by the recent recession of the glacier.

Boulder Glacier may be approached via the Boulder Ridge Trail number 605. The trail passes through a climax community of pacific silver fir and related species of disparate ages with many standing snags. In the fall, a large variety of mushroom species emerge. Near  elevation, the trail ascends a lateral glacial moraine. Soon thereafter, the trail disappears.

Boulder Ridge consists of scenic heather-covered benches and a number of lateral moraines left by vanished glaciers.  Glacial retreat has left the upper portion of the ridge barren and unstable and rockfall from the terminus of that portion of the glacier is a hazard to the unwary visitor.

Boulder Glacier is one of the more popular climbing routes on Mount Baker.  First climbed on August 24, 1891, it is most often ascended in combination with the cleaver between Boulder and Park Glacier to the north to bypass densely crevassed sections of the glacier. At about  elevation, the route passes to the southwest of steep rock and ice to reach the summit ridge east of Grant Peak.

Gallery

See also 
 Mount Baker
 Retreat of glaciers since 1850
 List of glaciers in the United States

References

External links 
 

Glaciers of Mount Baker
Glaciers of Washington (state)